Marcel Gerdil (24 January 1928 – 20 February 2012) was a French sprinter who competed in the 1952 Summer Olympics.

References

1928 births
2012 deaths
French male sprinters
Olympic athletes of France
Athletes (track and field) at the 1952 Summer Olympics